Sofia Amanda Karlberg Zoubir (born 6 December 1996) is a Swedish singer and songwriter who became famous by uploading covers on YouTube.

Personal 
She was born to a Moroccan mother and a Swedish father.

Karlberg has said that her biggest inspiration when it came to her music were Amy Winehouse, Christina Aguilera and Gerard Way.
She signed a record deal with Universal Music in 2016 and has released an original EP titled “Spotless Mind”.

Career 
Karlberg became a viral sensation when she covered Beyoncé's song "Crazy in Love". Her cover was a top 55 on the UK Official Singles Chart, Hot 40 UK, many weeks on Spotify's viral chart and on top of the charts on iTunes in many countries. She has also done many popular covers such as "Take Me to Church" by Hozier, which was featured on the teaser trailer for the third season of the TV series Empire, "Stay with Me" by Sam Smith and "Shameless" by The Weeknd. in October 2017, she released her cover of Rockstar by Post Malone.

References

External links 
 Facebook page

1996 births
Living people
Swedish pop singers
English-language singers from Sweden
Singers from Stockholm
21st-century Swedish singers
Swedish people of Moroccan descent
21st-century Swedish women singers